Trevor Walters (born 1961, London, England) is a British lovers rock reggae singer. His version of "Stuck on You" was a bigger hit in the UK Singles Chart than Lionel Richie's original.

Discography

Albums

Singles

References

Living people
1961 births
Singers from London
British reggae singers
20th-century Black British male singers